The 9th New Zealand Parliament was a term of the Parliament of New Zealand.

Elections for this term were held in 4 Māori electorates and 91 general electorates on 21 and 22 July 1884, respectively. A total of 95 MPs were elected. Parliament was prorogued in July 1887. During the term of this Parliament, four Ministries were in power.

Sessions

The 9th Parliament opened on 7 August 1884, following the 1884 general election. It sat for four sessions, and was prorogued on 15 July 1887.

Historical context

Political parties had not been established yet; this only happened after the 1890 election. Anyone attempting to form an administration thus had to win support directly from individual MPs. This made first forming, and then retaining a government difficult and challenging.

Ministries

The second Atkinson Ministry had been in power since 25 September 1883. This Ministry finished on 16 August 1884, just after the 1884 general election for the 9th Parliament. It was succeeded by the short-lived first Stout-Vogel Ministry, which lasted only twelve days until 28 August 1884. It was followed by an equally short third Atkinson Ministry, which folded on 3 September 1884. The second Stout-Vogel Ministry lasted to 8 October 1887, just after the 1887 general election to determine the composition of the 10th Parliament.

Electorates
The same 95 electorates that were defined through the 1881 electoral redistribution were used for the 1884 election.

Initial composition of the 9th Parliament
95 seats were created across the electorates.

Changes during term
There were a number of changes during the term of the 9th Parliament.

Notes

References

09